Mount Guntur is an active stratovolcano in western Java. The last eruption was in 1847. It produced frequent explosive eruptions in the 19th century, making it one of the most active volcanoes of western Java. However, since then, it has not erupted. The name Guntur means "thunder" in the Indonesian language.

The Kamojang crater, a geothermal power field and a tourist site, is located on the slopes of Mount Guntur.

See also
List of volcanoes in Indonesia

References

Volcanoes of West Java
Subduction volcanoes
Complex volcanoes